Sergio Oliva (July 4, 1941 – November 12, 2012) was a Cuban-American bodybuilder known as The Myth. He was a three-time Mr. Olympia winner.

Early life

Sergio Oliva was born on July 4, 1941 in Guantanamo, Cuba, during the presidency of Fulgencio Batista. As a teenager, after only a year of training, Sergio was able to perform clean & jerks in excess of 400 pounds. These feats caught the attention of the Cuban government, who  selected Sergio to represent Cuba at the upcoming 1961 Pan American Games. During his time in Jamaica representing Cuba at the Games, Oliva snuck out of his quarters while the guards were distracted. He then ran at top speed until he was safely inside the American consulate. Arriving breathlessly, he demanded and received political asylum. Soon, 65 other Cuban nationals followed him, including Castro's entire weightlifting team and their security guards. Shortly afterwards, Oliva was living in Miami, Florida, working as a TV repairman.

Life in the United States

Oliva then went on to win the Mr. Olympia title three years in a row, at 5 feet 10 inches and at a contest weight of 225–245lbs. Oliva's 1968 Mr. Olympia win was uncontested. In 1969, he won his third consecutive Mr. Olympia by beating a Mr. Europe, a Mr. International, and four-time Mr. Universe winner Arnold Schwarzenegger. In his 1977 autobiography, "Arnold: The Education of a Bodybuilder", Arnold tells of their first encounter:Then for the first time, I saw Sergio Oliva in person. I understood why they called him the Myth. It was as jarring as if I'd walked into a wall. He destroyed me. He was so huge, he was so fantastic, there was no way I could even think of beating him. I admitted my defeat and felt some of my pumps go away. I tried. But I'd been so taken back by my first sight of Sergio Oliva that I think I settled for 2nd place before we walked out on the stage I never like to admit defeat, but I thought Sergio was better. There were no two ways about it.However, Schwarzenegger won his first Mr. Olympia title by edging the Myth the following year with a score of 4-3. Oliva was banned from competing in the 1971 IFBB Mr. Olympia because he competed in the 1971 NABBA Mr. Universe. This was extremely controversial because Schwarzenegger had competed for this very same contest the year before and without Sergio to challenge Arnold, some felt that the contest was fixed. Schwarzenegger said:I'd coasted to my second title as Mr.Olympia, in Paris in 1971. The only possible challenger had been Sergio - nobody else was in my league - and he'd been barred from the contest, along with others, because of a dispute between federations.In 1972, under the High-Intensity Training (HIT) system of Arthur Jones, the designer of Nautilus training equipment, Oliva challenged Schwarzenegger for the 1972 Olympia in Essen Germany. By all accounts, Sergio was in his all-time greatest shape and completely confident he would regain the Mr. Olympia title. Arnold beat Sergio into 2nd place and was crowned Mr Olympia yet again. He said:[...] in Essen, it seemed like all the top Bodybuilders turned up at their very best except for me. Sergio was back, even more impressive than I remembered. Compared with all of the other Bodybuilders I've ever faced, Sergio really was in a class by himself. I was struck by that again the minute we were onstage. It was so hard to look impressive next to him with those incredible thighs, that impossibly tiny waist, those incredible triceps.In 1985, at the age of 44, Oliva returned for an attempt at the famed Mr. Olympia title one last time.  He could manage just an 8th-place finish, the same as the year before. Robert Kennedy, the publisher of the magazine MuscleMag International, wrote:Anyone who loves the sport of bodybuilding knows the name of Sergio Oliva, known as the Myth. I greatly admired him and consider him to be the all-time world's greatest physique. I saw him in competition many times, including his shows against Arnold. There is no doubt that with his wide shoulders and narrow hip structure he was superior to any other Bodybuilder of his generation. Sergio was not only the most aesthetic bodybuilder on stage but also the biggest... Sergio Oliva is considered by most to be the world's most genetically gifted bodybuilder... He set a whole new standard for competitive bodybuilding; loved by millions, revered by many, and feared by some. He was so huge and extremely proportioned that he used to bring chills to his adversaries. This is how he acquired the name of the Myth.

Personal
He served the city of Chicago as a police officer for more than 25 years.
In 1986, Sergio survived being shot by his then-wife Arleen Garrett. He sustained 5 bullet wounds to his abdomen from a .38 special.
His son Sergio Oliva Jr. is an IFBB Pro bodybuilder who won the 2015 NPC Nationals bodybuilding competition and has since competed on Mr. Olympia, Arnold Classic, and New York Pro stages.

Death
Sergio Oliva died on November 12, 2012 in Chicago, Illinois from apparent kidney failure. He was 71 years old and was the first Mr. Olympia to have died, followed by:
 Larry Scott - March 8th, 2014
 Franco Columbu - August 30th, 2019
 Shawn Rhoden - November 6th, 2021
 Chris Dickerson - December 23rd, 2021

Bodybuilding titles
1963 Mr Chicago – 1st
1964 Mr Illinois – 1st
1964 Mr America / AAU – 7th
1965 Junior Mr America / AAU – 2nd + “Most Muscular” trophy
1965 Mr America / AAU – 4th + “Most Muscular” trophy
1966 Junior Mr America / AAU – 1st + “Most Muscular” trophy
1966 Mr America / AAU – 2nd + “Most Muscular” trophy
1966 Mr World / IFBB – 1st in the “Tall” category + Overall Winner
1966 Mr Universe / IFBB – 1st
1966 Mr. Olympia / IFBB – 4th
1967 Mr. Olympia / IFBB – 1st
1967 Universe / IFBB – 1st overall
1968 Mr. Olympia / IFBB – 1st (uncontested)
1969 Mr. Olympia / IFBB – 1st
1970 Mr World / AAU (Pro) – 2nd in the “Tall” category
1970 Mr. Olympia / IFBB – 2nd
1971 Universe / NABBA (Pro) – 2nd in the “Tall” category
1972 Mr. Olympia / IFBB – 2nd
1972 Mr Galaxy / WBBG – 1st
1973 Mr International, Mr Azteca / IFBB (Pro) – 1st
1973 Mr Galaxy / WBBG – 1st
1974 Mr International / WBBG (Pro) – 1st
1975 Mr Olympus / WBBG – 1st
1976 Mr Olympus / WBBG – 1st
1977 Pro World Championships / WABBA – 1st
1978 Mr Olympus / WBBG – 1st
1980 Pro World Championships / WABBA – 1st
1980 Professional World cup / WABBA – 1st
1981 Professional World Cup / WABBA – 1st
1984 Mr. Olympia / IFBB – 8th
1984 Professional Mid-States Championships / WABBA – 1st
1985 Mr. Olympia / IFBB – 8th

See also
List of male professional bodybuilders

References

External links
SERGIO OLIVA: The Myth! Official Website
Sergio Oliva Profile
Sergio Oliva Gallery
El cubano que derrotó a Schwarzenegger
SergioOlivaJr.com Son's Official Website
exclusive interview of Sergio Oliva for Lexnews magazine in 2007
Sergio Oliva - The Myth and the heart throb! Sergio Oliva Article at MuscleMecca 2013

| colspan = 3 align = center | Mr. Olympia 
|- 
| width = 30% align = center | Preceded by:Larry Scott
| width = 40% align = center | First (1967)
| width = 30% align = center | Succeeded by:himself
|- 
| width = 30% align = center | Preceded by:himself
| width = 40% align = center | Second (1968)
| width = 30% align = center | Succeeded by:himself
|- 
| width = 30% align = center | Preceded by:himself
| width = 40% align = center | Third (1969)
| width = 30% align = center | Succeeded by:Arnold Schwarzenegger

American bodybuilders
1941 births
2012 deaths
Professional bodybuilders
Chicago Police Department officers
Cuban emigrants to the United States
People from Havana
Sportspeople from Chicago
Deaths from kidney disease